Bananatype is five-track EP released by the Filipino alternative band Eraserheads in 1997 under BMG Records (Pilipinas), Inc. This EP contains the tracks "Bananatype/I Can't Remember You", "Harana", "Police Woman", and "Tikman".

Track listing

Personnel
 Ely Buendia - vocals
 Buddy Zabala - bass
 Marcus Adoro - guitars
 Raimund Marasigan - drums

Album credits
Executive Producer: Rudy Y. Tee
A&R Executive: Vic Valenciano
Additional Subtraction: Sancho
Design anf Layout: Dr. Day Cabuhat & Dino Ignacio (Fractal Cow Studio)
Track 1,3,4 Mixed By: Angee Rozul
Track 2 Mixed By: Lito Palco
Track 5 mixed By Mark Laccay

References

1997 EPs
Eraserheads albums